La Ligua is a Chilean city and commune, capital of the Petorca Province in Valparaíso Region.

The city is known for its textile manufacturing and traditional Chilean pastry production.

Demographics
According to data from the 2002 Census of Population and Housing, La Ligua had 31,987 inhabitants; of these, 24,214 (75.7%) lived in urban areas and 7,773 (24.3%) in rural areas. At that time, there were 16,079 men and 15,908 women.

Administration

As a commune, La Ligua is a third-level administrative division of Chile administered by a communal council, headed by an alcalde who is directly elected every four years. The 2008-2012 alcalde was Rodrigo Sánchez Villalobos. The communal council has the following members:
 Hugo Díaz Tapia
 Ana Ardiles Saavedra
 María Teresa Cerda García
 Marisol Leiva Cortés
 Juan Yáñez Peña
 Ernesto Molina Miranda

Within the electoral divisions of Chile, La Ligua belongs to the 10th electoral district and 5th senatorial constituency.

References

External links
  Municipality of La Ligua

Populated places in Petorca Province
Capitals of Chilean provinces
Communes of Chile
Populated places established in 1754
1750s establishments in the Captaincy General of Chile
1754 establishments in the Viceroyalty of Peru